Triumf Riza (7 May 1978 – 30 August 2007) was a police officer, and member of an elite protection unit with the fledgling Kosovo Police Service, who was killed in the line of duty during an ongoing clash with the Enver Sekiraqa gang, an Ethnic Albanian crime syndicate that operates in Kosovo. Riza is notable in that he was the young police force's first recognized hero.

Special Force career
Triumf Riza was one of the earlier officers hired onto the new Kosovo police force. Well known within Kosovo as a competition body builder, and in excellent physical condition, Riza quickly gained a position on the Kosovo Police Protection Unit, guarding VIP personnel and visitors to Kosovo. Corruption within the Kosovo Police Force became apparent even in its earliest stages, much due to the low salaries paid to the officers. Organized crime factions, when unable to bribe Kosovo officers, used intimidation as a means to gain an upper hand over any they deemed a threat to their business. Triumf Riza, however, refused bribes offered, resulting in two assassination attempts, both of which were thwarted when he engaged his attackers, the second time resulting in a gunfight. These incidents resulted in Riza becoming an especially respected "hero" within the young police force, which was much needed as a boost for morale due to the force having suffered several officers killed over its young existence, in addition to its ongoing battle with internal corruption, low salaries, and non-existent insurance for injured officers.

Kosovo first began working towards its independence in the 1990s, this heightened when NATO took action against the forces of Yugoslavia, and the United Nations dispatched International Police with its UNMIK organization to stabilize the region. With the birth of the Kosovo Police Service, UNMIK Police were tasked with training and organizing the newly formed police force. One of the main concerns quickly became organized crime, with both the Albanian and Bulgarian mafia immediately taking advantage of the weak economic situation in Kosovo, to set up prostitution and illegal drug rings. Enver Sekiraqa quickly climbed to the top of organized crime, and was arrested several times for illegal weapons and other charges, but never received a sentence exceeding six months in jail. This was believed due to corruption within the court system of Kosovo.

Death
The feud between Riza and Enver Sekiraqa escalated when Riza became involved romantically with locally well known singer Adelina Ismajli, previously involved with Sekiraqa. On August 30, 2007, Riza was ambushed on a crowded street in broad daylight and shot to death in Pristina. He was the third Kosovo Police Officer killed in 2007. The incident sparked outrage from the public, resulting in over 3,000 protestors marching in down town Pristina. Within days the Kosovo Police and UNMIK Police had arrested some thirty persons in connection with the conspiracy to murder Riza, quickly narrowing that number to eight, with one confessing to the shooting. That suspect has since been sentenced to Kosovo's maximum prison sentence. However, Enver Sekiraqa is believed to have organized the assassination, but fled Kosovo immediately following the murder. Former freedom fighter and now Kosovo Prime Minister Agim Ceku, Interior Minister Blerim Kuqi, and politician and former soldier Fatmir Limaj joined in the protest against organized crime.

Notes and references
Notes:

External links
Triumf Riza – Condolence Book
Thousands Protest Murder of Police Officer

UNMIK Online Anti-Corruption
Kosovo's Choice Between Organized Crime or Justice
UNMIK News
Southeastern Europe at a Glance
UNMIK Supports Anti-Crime Demonstration
UN Daily News

1979 births
2007 deaths
People from Kaçanik
20th-century Albanian people
21st-century Albanian people
Male murder victims
Kosovan police officers
Kosovan murder victims
People murdered in Kosovo
People murdered by organized crime
Kosovo Albanians
2007 crimes in Kosovo
2000s murders in Kosovo
2007 murders in Europe